The chess events at the 2007 Pan Arab Games were held from 13 to 21 November at the Olympic Centre in Maadi, a suburb of Cairo, Egypt. Medals were awarded to the teams scoring the highest number of board points, as well as to individual players with the best performances by percentage score on each board with at least five games played. Medals were also awarded to the best overall performances on any board by percentage score. Bronze medals were awarded for both third and fourth-place individual performances.

The men's teams played a nine-round Swiss-system tournament. Each men's team consisted of six players and matches were contested over four . Egypt was the only team to finish the tournament undefeated, conceding only one draw to Algeria and winning the gold medal for the second time in a row with 26 board points. Syria scored 23½ board points to win the silver medal, while Algeria finished with 20½ board points and took bronze.

The women's teams played a round robin. Each women's team consisted of four players and matches were contested over three boards. The Egyptian and Syrian teams tied for first with 17½ board points, but Egypt won the gold medal on superior match points (7½/8 vs. 6½/8 for Syria), having beaten Syria in their direct encounter. Iraq scored 13½ board points to win bronze, while defending gold medallists Algeria, which drew all three medal-winning teams in their direct encounters, scored 13 board points to finish fourth.

Participating nations 

Eight countries sent both men's and women's teams. Lebanon only competed in the women's tournament, while Jordan, Qatar, Sudan, and Tunisia only competed in the men's tournament.

Medal summary

Medal table

See also
The French Wikipedia article on chess in the Pan Arab Games lists all Pan Arab medallists in chess from 1999 to 2011.

Notes

References

Pan Arab Games
Events at the 2007 Pan Arab Games
2007 Pan Arab Games
2007 Pan Arab Games